Heaven or Hell is the debut studio album by American singer and rapper Don Toliver. It was released on March 13, 2020, by Cactus Jack Records, Atlantic Records and We Run It Entertainment. The album features guest appearances by Travis Scott, Kaash Paige, Quavo and Offset from Migos, and Sheck Wes. It also contains production from high-profile record producers, mainly from WondaGurl and Mike Dean, as well as Sonny Digital, Frank Dukes, and Cubeatz, among others.

Heaven or Hell was supported by four singles: "No Idea", "Can't Feel My Legs", "Had Enough" and "After Party". "No Idea" became his highest-charting single on the US Billboard Hot 100, peaking at number 43. The album received generally positive reviews from music critics and was a commercial success. It debuted at number seven on the US Billboard 200 chart, earning 44,000 album-equivalent units in its first week.

Background
In 2018, after guest appearing on Travis Scott's third studio album Astroworld, Toliver signed onto the former's record label Cactus Jack Records, along with Atlantic Records and We Run It Entertainment.

In May 2019, Toliver stated the album's original title as "Resurrection".

In December 2019, Toliver was featured on the Cactus Jack compilation album JackBoys.

On March 10, 2020, Toliver announced Heaven or Hell on social media alongside the album's artwork which was created by illustrator Matthew McCormick.

Recording
In March 2020, American record producer Sonny Digital said on Twitter that he was part of the project, while also confirming songs "Cardigan" and "After Party", both which he co-produced. Other producers include Canadian record producer WondaGurl, who co-produced "Can't Feel My Legs" and American record producer TM88, who co-produced "Had Enough".

Promotion
A snippet of the song "After Party" was previously featured on Scott's Netflix documentary Look Mom I Can Fly, which spread hype around the song. It originally featured a verse from Travis Scott which didn't make it to the final version. He later performed a portion of the song at the 2019 Astroworld Festival. Another version of the song, without Scott, was leaked featuring a different beat and outro.

Singles
On May 29, 2019, the album's lead single "No Idea" was released and was accompanied by a music video. On December 13, Toliver released the album's second single "Can't Feel My Legs", which was also accompanied by a music video. On December 27, Toliver released the third single "Had Enough" featuring American rappers Quavo and Offset from the hip-hop trio Migos, which was also on the Cactus Jack compilation album JackBoys, released on the same day, as the second single of that project. On June 23, 2020, "After Party" was released to urban contemporary radio in the United States, making it the fourth single.

Critical reception

Heaven or Hell was met with generally positive reviews from music critics.

Commercial performance
Heaven or Hell debuted at number seven on the US Billboard 200 chart, earning 44,000 album-equivalent units (including 3,000 copies as pure album sales) in its first week. This became Toliver's first US top-ten debut on the chart. On February 22, 2023, the album was certified platinum by the Recording Industry Association of America (RIAA) for combined sales and album-equivalent units of over 1,000,000 units in the United States.

Track listing

Notes
  signifies a co-producer
  signifies an additional producer
  signifies an uncredited co-producer
  signifies an uncredited additional producer
 "Heaven or Hell" was originally released as "Heaven or Hell Intro".

Personnel
Musicians
 Nkenge 1x – additional keyboards 

Technical
 Jimmy Cash – recording , mixing assistant , mixing 
 Travis Scott – recording 
 Zach Steele – recording 
 Trevor Coulter – recording , engineering 
 Nate Alford – recording 
 Colton Eatmon – engineering 
 Shawn Morenberg – engineering assistant 
 Sage Skolfield – mixing assistant 
 Sean Solymar – mixing assistant 
 Mike Dean – mixing , mastering

Charts

Weekly charts

Year-end charts

Certifications

References

2020 debut albums
Don Toliver albums
Atlantic Records albums
Albums produced by Cubeatz
Albums produced by Sonny Digital
Albums produced by TM88
Albums produced by Travis Scott
Albums produced by WondaGurl
Cactus Jack Records albums
Trap music albums